This article lists the prime ministers of Guinea, since the establishment of the office of Prime Minister in 1972.

List

Key
Political parties

Other factions

Officeholders

Notes

Timeline

See also
Guinea
List of presidents of Guinea
List of colonial governors of French Guinea
Politics of Guinea
Lists of office-holders

External links
 Government
 Official site of the Guinean government
Guinea's state structure

Guinea
Prime Ministers